The Dog House Australia is an Australian factual show which first aired on Network 10 on 12 October 2021 and was originally narrated by Chris Brown. It is based on the UK series The Dog House.

The series was renewed for a second season in October 2021 and premiered on 8 March 2022. A third season was renewed in October 2022 and premiered on 8 February 2023 with Mark Coles Smith replacing Chris Brown as series narrator.

Episodes

Series overview

Season 1 (2021)

Season 2 (2022)

Season 3 (2023)

References 

Australian reality television series
Network 10 original programming
2021 Australian television series debuts